Sérgio Henrique Silva Guedes or simply Serginho (born December 8, 1979) is a Brazilian footballer who plays as a defensive midfielder. He currently plays for Clube Atlético Metropolitano.

Honours
Brazilian League (3rd division): 2005
Minas Gerais State League: 2007

Contract
1 January 2007 to 31 December 2007

External links
 sambafoot
 CBF
 zerozero.pt
 placar
 Guardian Stats Centre

1979 births
Living people
Brazilian footballers
Botafogo de Futebol e Regatas players
Esporte Clube Vitória players
Bangu Atlético Clube players
Sociedade Esportiva e Recreativa Caxias do Sul players
Clube do Remo players
Clube Atlético Mineiro players
Ituano FC players
Expatriate footballers in Thailand
Association football midfielders
Footballers from Rio de Janeiro (city)